Mont-Carmel is a municipality in the Canadian province of Quebec, located in the Kamouraska Regional County Municipality, on the Canada–United States border.

Geography
Spanning over 75% of the width of the Bas-Saint-Laurent region in which it resides, Mont-Carmel is the second largest subdivision within the Kamouraska Regional County Municipality and borders the United States at its southeast limit.

Communities and locations
The following designated areas reside within the municipality's boundaries:
Eatonville – a hamlet located at 
Lac-de-l'Est – a vacation cottage community located at

Municipal council
 Mayor: Denis Lévesque
 Councillors: Colette Beaulieu, Luc Forgues, Lauréat Jean, Karine St-Jean, Kathleen Saint-Jean, Pierre Saillant

See also
 List of municipalities in Quebec

References

External links
 

Municipalities in Quebec
Incorporated places in Bas-Saint-Laurent